"It's Mine" is a song performed by American hip hop duo Mobb Deep for their fourth studio album Murda Muzik (1999). The song features guest vocals from friend and fellow Queensbridge artist Nas. 

The song's instrumental is based on a sample of the title theme of the 1983 film Scarface (credited as "Scarface Cues") which was composed by Giorgio Moroder. This is the second time that Mobb Deep used music from the film for one of their singles, with the first being "G.O.D. Pt. III".

The chorus of the song is also both a lyrical and instrumental interpolation of the 1998 song by female R&B singers Brandy and Monica, "The Boy Is Mine". The original Brandy and Monica lyrics were "You need to give it up/Had about enough/It's not hard to see/The boy is mine". Where the chorus in "It's Mine" (sung by Nas) goes "Y'all need to give it up/We don't give a fuck/What y'all niggas want/Thug life is mine".

The video was directed by Hype Williams.

Track listing
Side A
"It's Mine" [Dirty version]
"It's Mine" [Instrumental]

Side B
"It's Mine" [Clean version]
"It's Mine" [Acappella]

Charts

External links 
 

2000 songs
Mobb Deep songs
Nas songs
Music videos directed by Hype Williams
Songs written by Nas
Loud Records singles
Song recordings produced by Havoc (musician)
Songs written by Prodigy (rapper)
Songs written by Havoc (musician)
Gangsta rap songs